Dishoek is a neighbourhood of Koudekerke in the Dutch province of Zeeland. It is a part of the municipality of Veere, and lies about 4 km west of Vlissingen.

The hamlet of Dishoek near Koudekerke became a seaside resort due to its beaches, and contains holiday homes, campsites and hotels.

References

Populated places in Zeeland
Veere